Gülsen Demirtürk (born 6 March 2000) is a Turkish karateka competing in the kumite. She is a member of Kocaeli Büyükşehir Belediyesi Kağıt Spor Kulübü.

Private life
Gülsen Demirtürk was born 6 March 2000.

Demirtürk was motivated for karate by her father because she was a highly energetic girl in her youth.

She studied at Sakarya University.In the beginning of 2022, she was appointed as a teacher of physical education  at a highschool in Dilovası, Kocaeli.

Sports career
Demirtürk took the silver medal in the U21 women's kumite 55 kg category at the WKF Cadet, Junior & U21 World Championship 2019 held in Santiago, Chile.

She won the silver medal in the Team kumite event at the 
2021 European Karate Championships held in Poreč, Croatia.

References

2000 births
Living people
Turkish female karateka
Sakarya University alumni
Kocaeli Büyükşehir Belediyesi Kağıt Spor athletes
21st-century Turkish sportswomen